A domain wall is a term used in physics which can have similar meanings in magnetism, optics, or string theory.  These phenomena can all be generically described as topological solitons which occur whenever a discrete symmetry is spontaneously broken.

Magnetism

In magnetism, a domain wall is an interface separating magnetic domains. It is a transition between different magnetic moments and usually undergoes an angular displacement of 90° or 180°. A domain wall is a gradual reorientation of individual moments across a finite distance. The domain wall thickness depends on the anisotropy of the material, but on average spans across around 100–150 atoms.

The energy of a domain wall is simply the difference between the magnetic moments before and after the domain wall was created. This value is usually expressed as energy per unit wall area.

The width of the domain wall varies due to the two opposing energies that create it: the magnetocrystalline anisotropy energy and the exchange energy, both of which tend to be as low as possible so as to be in a more favorable energetic state. The anisotropy energy is lowest when the individual magnetic moments are aligned with the crystal lattice axes thus reducing the width of the domain wall. Conversely, the exchange energy is reduced when the magnetic moments are aligned parallel to each other and thus makes the wall thicker, due to the repulsion between them (where anti-parallel alignment would bring them closer, working to reduce the wall thickness). In the end an equilibrium is reached between the two and the domain wall's width is set as such.

An ideal domain wall would be fully independent of position, but the structures are not ideal and so get stuck on inclusion sites within the medium, also known as crystallographic defects. These include missing or different (foreign) atoms, oxides, insulators and even stresses within the crystal. This prevents the formation of domain walls and also inhibits their propagation through the medium. Thus a greater applied magnetic field is required to overcome these sites.

Note that the magnetic domain walls are exact solutions to classical nonlinear equations of magnets (Landau–Lifshitz model, nonlinear Schrödinger equation and so on).

Symmetry of multiferroic domain walls
Since domain walls can be considered as thin layers, their symmetry is described by one of the 528 magnetic layer groups. To determine the layer's physical properties, a continuum approximation is used which leads to point-like layer groups. If continuous translation operation is considering as identity, these groups transform to magnetic point groups. It was shown that there are 125 such groups. It was found that if a magnetic point group is pyroelectric and/or pyromagnetic then the domain wall carries polarization and/or magnetization respectively. These criteria were derived from the conditions of the appearance of the uniform polarization and/or magnetization. After their application to any inhomogeneous region, they predict the existence of even parts in functions of the distribution of order parameters. Identification of the remaining odd parts of these functions was formulated based on symmetry transformations that interrelate domains. The symmetry classification of magnetic domain walls contains 64 magnetic point groups.

Symmetry-based predictions of the structure of the multiferroic domain walls have been proven using phenomenology coupling via magnetization and/or polarization spatial derivatives (flexomagnetoelectric).

Depinning of a domain wall
Non-magnetic inclusions in the volume of a ferromagnetic material, or dislocations in crystallographic structure, can cause "pinning" of the domain walls (see animation). Such pinning sites cause the domain wall to sit in a local energy minimum and an external field is required to "unpin" the domain wall from its pinned position. The act of unpinning will cause sudden movement of the domain wall and sudden change of the volume of both neighbouring domains; this causes Barkhausen noise.

Types of walls

Bloch wall
A Bloch wall is a narrow transition region at the boundary between magnetic domains, over which the magnetization changes from its value in one domain to that in the next, named after the physicist Felix Bloch.  In a Bloch domain wall, the magnetization rotates about the normal of the domain wall (in other words, the magnetization always points along the domain wall plane in a 3D system), in contrast to Néel domain walls.

Bloch domain walls appear in bulk materials, i.e. when sizes of magnetic material are considerably larger than domain wall width (according to the width definition of Lilley ). In this case energy of the demagnetization field does not impact the micromagnetic structure of wall. The mixed cases are possible as well when demagnetization field changes the magnetic domains (magnetization direction in domains) but not the domain walls.

Néel wall
A Néel wall is a narrow transition region between magnetic domains, named after the French physicist Louis Néel. In the Néel wall, the magnetization smoothly rotates from the direction of magnetization within the first domain to the direction of magnetization within the second. In contrast to Bloch walls, the magnetization rotates about a line that is orthogonal to the normal of the domain wall (in other words, it rotates such that it points out of the domain wall plane in a 3D system). It consists of a core with fast varying rotation (where the magnetization points nearly orthogonal to the two domains) and two tails where the rotation logarithmically decays. Néel walls are the common magnetic domain wall type in very thin films where the exchange length is very large compared to the thickness. Néel walls would spread across the whole volume if not for magnetic anisotropy.

See also

 Ferromagnetism
 Flux pinning
 Ginzburg–Landau theory
 Magnetic domain
 Magnetic flux quantum
 Quantum vortex
 Topological defect

References

External links
 Illustration of a Bloch and Néel Wall
 Bloch wall transition animation
 2-d stability of the Néel wall, Antonio DeSimone, Hans Knüpfer and Felix Otto in Calculus of Variations and Partial Differential Equations, 2006

Ferromagnetism